Koubaye is a village and commune in the Cercle of Mopti in the Mopti Region of Mali. The commune contains 8 villages and in 2009 had a population of 6,516.

References

External links
.

Communes of Mopti Region